At Viengkham (born 24 October 2000) is a Laotian footballer who plays as a full-back for Master 7 in the Lao League 1.

International career
At represented Laos at the 2021 Southeast Asian Games. During the match against Cambodia, he collided with Phat Sokha and made him unconscious, but later saved him from swallowing his tongue. However, this did not prevent him from receiving a yellow card. He also scored the only goal in the match against eventual silver medalists Thailand, but it was an own goal.

References

2000 births
Living people
Laotian footballers
Laos international footballers
Association football defenders
People from Houaphanh province
Competitors at the 2021 Southeast Asian Games
Southeast Asian Games competitors for Laos